The British Dental Journal is a bimonthly peer-reviewed medical journal published by Nature Research on behalf of the British Dental Association, of which it is an official journal. It was established in 1872 as the Monthly Review of Dental Surgery and renamed Journal of the British Dental Association in 1881, before obtaining its current title in 1904. It absorbed the Mouth Mirror and Dental Gazette (1950) and later the Dental Magazine (1970). The journal is a member of the Committee on Publication Ethics. According to the Journal Citation Reports, the journal had a 2020 impact factor of 1.626.

References

External links 

Dentistry journals
English-language journals
Nature Research academic journals
Bimonthly journals
Publications established in 1872
Hybrid open access journals
Academic journals associated with learned and professional societies of the United Kingdom